Euriphene kahli is a butterfly in the family Nymphalidae. It is found in the Democratic Republic of the Congo (Uele, Kinshasa, Sankuru and Lualaba).

References

Butterflies described in 1920
Euriphene
Endemic fauna of the Democratic Republic of the Congo
Butterflies of Africa